Hen Domen Welsh, meaning "old mound", is the site of a medieval timber motte-and-bailey castle in Powys, Wales. It is the site of the original Montgomery Castle, and was built by Roger de Montgomery in 1070.
From 1105 the castle was the home of the de Boulers (Bowdler) family, and it is from Baldwin de Boulers that Montgomery gets its Welsh name, Trefaldwyn "The Town of Baldwin".
When the castle was rebuilt in stone (1223–1234), it was decided to rebuild it on a rocky promontory a mile to the south-east – the location of the current town of Montgomery, Powys.
The Hen Domen site has been extensively excavated.

There are permanent exhibitions relating to both the medieval Hen Domen and Norman Montgomery Castles and their archaeological excavations (with scale models of both castles) in The Old Bell Museum in Montgomery.

Location

Description

Other evidence and remains include a wooden palisade which stood on the bailey defences, a  wooden tower, a gatehouse, a granary and a possible chapel.

History

Hen Domen was built sometime soon after 1071 when Roger de Montgomery, the first Earl of Shrewsbury, was given extensive areas of Shropshire by William the Conqueror. Archaeological evidence suggests that it was completed before 1100. Roger de Montgomery named the castle Montgomery after the town in Normandy where he came from.

Access

The site can be viewed from a nearby lane off the B4385, but the site itself is on private land and can only be visited with the permission of the owner.

See also
Castles in Great Britain and Ireland
List of castles in Wales
List of Scheduled Roman to modern Monuments in Powys (Montgomeryshire)

References

Further reading

 – digitised slides from excavations at Hen Domen

External links
 "Montgomery" at Genealogy and History of the Bowdler Family
 The Old Bell Museum, Montgomery, Powys
 Photos of reconstructive model of Hen Domen, Old Bell Museum via People's Collection Wales

Castles in Powys
Castle ruins in Wales
Scheduled monuments in Powys
Montgomery, Powys